Australian Maritime College Rugby Union Football Club is a Rugby Union club in Tasmania. Established in 2012, the club is a member of the Tasmanian Rugby Union, affiliated with the Australian Rugby Union and played in the Tasmanian Statewide League until 2019.
 
The club's home ground was at Royal Park in the Launceston, Tasmania. Known as the Vikings or AMC, the club colours are navy blue and white. The club formerly fielded a team in the Men's First Division.

Premierships

Senior Team

References

External links
Australian Rugby Union
Tasmanian Rugby Union
Australian Maritime College Rugby Union Football Club

Rugby union teams in Tasmania
Rugby clubs established in 2012
2012 establishments in Australia
Sport in Launceston, Tasmania
University and college rugby union clubs in Australia